Capua semiferana is a species of moth of the family Tortricidae. It is found in New Zealand.

References

Moths described in 1863
Capua (moth)
Endemic moths of New Zealand
Endemic fauna of New Zealand